Shastri Sisters: Chaar Dil Ek Dhadkan ( "Shastri sisters: four hearts, one beat"), commonly known as Shastri Sisters, is an Indian television series that aired from July 21, 2014, to  August 8, 2015, on Colors TV. The show stars Ishita Ganguly, Sonal Vengurlekar, Vijayendra Kumeria, and Sumit Bhardwaj. Its plot follows four sisters as they journey from Kanpur to Delhi.

The show was dubbed in Telugu as Manam, which airs on Gemini TV, and in Tamil as Kanchana airing on Raj TV. It is titled Tere Naal Ishq on Colors Rishtey.

Plot
Four sisters Alka, Anushka, Devyani, and Piya live with their father Narayan Shastri in Kanpur. They had lost their mother at a very young age and were raised single-handedly by Narayan. They move to Delhi after Narayan gets a job transfer, where they stay at his childhood friend Surinder Sareen's house. Surinder lives with his wife Minty and two sons, Neil and Rajat. Minty and Neil hate the sisters and try to oust them. 

Narayan learns that Alka loves Rajeev, and thus takes a marriage proposal to Rajeev's father, who insults him. After knowing all this, Alka apologizes to Narayan. He fixes her alliance to his friend Harishankar's son Rohan Pandey, thus the two marry. Both Anushka and Devyani fall in love with Rajat, who has feelings for Anushka. Neil falls in love with Devyani but she rejects him. When Rajat tries to confess his love for Anushka to his family, Minty and Nikki decides to seek revenge for Neil from Devyani. They create a misunderstanding and make everyone believe that Rajat loves Devyani. Everyone prepare for their engagement and when Anushka learns that Devyani also loves Rajat, she sacrifices her love for Devyani.
But Rajat also loves Anushka and on his engagement day he learns that he getting engaged to Devyani and he wants to tell her truth, but is stopped by Anushka. And she gives her kasam to become engaged to her sister and he agrees. Rajat and Devyani become engaged. Ass Minty and Nikki's plan fail, they again try to expose Anushka and Rajat. This time they become successful. Devyani becomes heartbroken after knowing the truth and she insults Anushka, accusing her of taking her fiancé, but Anushka remains silent. Rajat criticises her for disrespecting her sister, and tells her that he loves Anushka and not her. Anushka refuses and says that Rajat is only Devyani's.

The next day, Surinder and Rajat learn about Minty and Nikki. Surinder ousts out Nikki from the house and scolds Minty. 

Rajat's ex-girlfriend Karishma appears. To make Anushka jealous, Rajat announces his marriage to Karishma, but Anushka remains focused on her relationship with her sister. Later, Devyani tries to convince Anushka to stop Rajat's marriage and discusses this matter with Rajat, who insists that Anushka professes her love for him first. He is later arrested. and Anushka is blamed for his arrest. It is revealed that Karishma is responsible.

Rajat and Anushka marry. Neil is forced by Minty to marry her friend Leela's daughter Kajal, which upsets Devyani, who decides to work with Alka. Someone attacks Devyani at work and she suspects Neil's involvement. Anushka blames Neil for hurting Devyani, but he insists that he is innocent. After three days everyone returns home and Neil returns from jail.

Kajal is revealed to have married Neil only for his property, so Minty scolds her and ends her relationship with Neil. Kajal pushes Anushka off a cliff, and Rajat is kidnapped.

One year later, the Sareens and Shastris celebrate. Rajat and Devyani begin the wedding ceremony, and Anushka is revealed to be alive.

Cast

Main

 Ishita Ganguly as Anushka Rajat sareen – Narayan's 2nd daughter; Alka's younger sister; Devyani and Piya's elder sister; Rajat's wife
 Vijayendra Kumeria as Squadron leader Rajat Sareen – Minty and Surinder's elder son; Neil's elder brother; Anushka's husband 
 Neha Pednekar as Alka Pandey – Narayan's 1st daughter; Anushka, Devyani and Piya's elder sister
 Sujay Reu as Rohan Pandey – Alka's husband
 Sonal Vengurlekar as Devyani Shastri – Narayan's 3rd daughter; Alka and Anushka's younger sister; Piya's elder sister
 Sumit Bhardwaj as Neil Sareen – Minty and Surinder's younger son; Rajat's younger brother

Recurring
 Rajesh Jais as Narayan Shastri – Alka, Anushka, Devyani and Piya's father
 Pragati Chourasiya as Piya Shastri – Narayan's 4th daughter; Alka, Anushka and Devyani's younger sister
 Neelu Kohli as Mintakshi "Minty" Sareen – Rajat and Neil's mother
 Gireesh Sahedev as Surinder Sareen – Rajat and Neil's father
 Chaitrali Gupte as Vrinda Pandey
 Prithvi Zutshi as Harishankar Pandey
 Shraddha Jaiswal as Aastha Pandey
 Navneet Nishan as Nikki 
 Puneet Vashisht as Dr. Raghavendra Singh 
 Sudeep Sahir as Veerarav "Veer" Rajshekhari
 Sumit Verma as Rajeev – Alka's ex-boyfriend
 Sudha Chandran as Buaji 
 Swati Kumar as Karishma 
 Priyanka Khera as Kajal Neel Sareen – Neil's ex-wife
 Poonam Bhatia as Leela Massi – Minty's friend
 Smita Singh as Inspector Guggal Pandey (2015)
 Dipika Kakar as Simar

Dubs

Kanchana (English: Kanchana – Soul of Affection and Love) is a Tamil serial and a soap opera that premiered on 31 August 2015.

Manam is a Telugu serial and a soap opera that premiered on 8 February 2016 and airs Monday through Friday.

Cast (Tamil version)
 Neha Pednekar as Kanchana Narayan Shastri/Kanchana Rajan Harishankar
 Ishita Ganguly as Akila Narayan Shastri/Akila Ranjeet Sareen
 Sonal Vengurlekar as Devyani Narayan Shastri
 Pragati Chourasiya as Priya Narayan Shastri
 Vijayendra Kumeria as Rajat Saravanan Sareen
 Sumit Bhardwaj as Rajesh Saravanan Sareen
 Sujay Reu as Rajan Harishankar Pandey
 Rajesh Jais as Narayan Shastri
 Neelu Kohli as Meenakshi Saravanan Sareen
 Gireesh Sahedev as  Saravanan Sareen
 Chaitrali Gupte as Brinda Harishankar Pandey
 Prithvi Zutshi as Harishankar Pandey
 Shraddha Jaiswal as Asha Harishankar Pandey

Cast (Telugu version)
 Neha Pednekar as Alekhya Narayan Shastri
 Ishita Ganguly as Anuskha Narayan Shastri/Anuskha Ranjeet Sareen
 Sonal Vengurlekar as Devyani Narayan Shastri
 Pragati Chourasiya as Priya Narayan Shastri
 Vijayendra Kumeria as Ranjeet  Sareen
 Sumit Bhardwaj as  Nitin Sareen
 Sujay Reu as Rohan Harishankar Pandey
 Rajesh Jais as Narayan Shastri
 Neelu Kohli as Meenakshi Surinder Sareen
 Gireesh Sahedev as  Surendra Sareen
 Chaitrali Gupte as Brinda Harishankar Pandey
 Prithvi Zutshi as Harishankar Pandey
 Shraddha Jaiswal as Asha Harishankar Pandey

References

2014 Indian television series debuts
2015 Indian television series endings
Colors TV original programming
Indian drama television series
Indian television series
Television shows set in Delhi